Horace Davey, Baron Davey, PC, FRS, FBA (30 August 183320 February 1907) was an English judge and Liberal politician.

Background and education

Davey was the son of Peter Davey, of Horton, Buckinghamshire and Caroline Emma Pace, and was born in Camberwell, Surrey. He was educated at Rugby and University College, Oxford, where he matriculated on 20 March 1852. He took a double first-class in Classics and Mathematics (Moderations and Finals), was senior mathematical scholar and Eldon law scholar (1859), and was elected a Fellow of his college (1856–67).

Having achieved a BA (1856), and an MA (1859) Davey decided on a career in the law.  He was admitted to Lincoln's Inn on 19 January 1857.  On 26 January 1861, he was called to the Bar at Lincoln's Inn.

Almost as soon as he started work as a law reporter, he married the following summer, on 5 August 1862.  He was employed on young titles such as New Reports, when he joined in marriage Louisa Hawes Donkin at St George's, Camberwell.  She was the daughter of John Donkin of Ormond House, Old Kent Road, a civil engineer.

Davey's success at law reporting allowed him to read in the chambers of John Wickens, 8 New Square, Lincoln's Inn.  As an Equity pleader and early pupillage, he became a junior counsel at the Treasury, devilling in Chancery.  When John Wickens was promoted as Vice-Chancellor to Chancery division, he went with his old master, as his secretary.  He continued in the post (1873–74) when Vice-Chancellor Hall gained office.

On the basis of this experience he was recommended for silk on 23 June 1875.  He selected to join Sir George Jessel's court, often appearing before the redoubtable Joseph Chitty.  Quickly moved to the House of Lords, Davey had rapidly developed a reputation for argumentation at the bar.  Viscount Alverstone called him "the most brilliant barrister."  As counsel his well-known cases included: Speight v. Gaunt (1883), Learoyd v. Whiteley (1887), Derry v. Peek (1889).  Lord Haldane, himself, the greatest intellectual philosopher-politician of his generation described Davey as "the finest advocate on pure points of law..." Lord MacNaughten believed that there was no one better at "arguing a point of practice."

Legal career
Devoting himself to the Chancery side, Davey soon acquired a large practice, and in 1875 became a Queen's Counsel In 1880, he was returned to Parliament as a Liberal for Christchurch, but lost his seat in 1885. On Gladstone's return to power in 1886, he was appointed Solicitor-General and was knighted, but had no seat in the House of Commons, being defeated at both Ipswich and Stockport in 1886; in 1888 he found a seat at Stockton-on-Tees, but was rejected by that constituency in 1892.
 
Davey was standing counsel to the University of Oxford, and senior counsel to the Charity Commissioners, and was engaged in all the important Chancery suits of his time. Among the chief leading cases in which he took a prominent part were those of The Mogul Steamship Company v. M'Gregor, Gow & Co., 1892, Boswell v. Coaks, 1884, Erlanger v. New Sombrero Company, 1878, and the Ooregum Gold Mines Company v. Roper, 1892; he was counsel for the promoters in the trial of Edward King, Bishop of Lincoln, and leading counsel in the Berkeley peerage case. In 1893, he was raised to the bench as a Lord Justice of Appeal, and on 18 August the next year was made a Lord of Appeal in Ordinary and a life peer as Baron Davey, of Fernhurst in the County of Sussex. Lord Davey's great legal knowledge was displayed in his judgments no less than at the bar. In legislation, he was a keen promoter of the act passed in 1906 for the checking of gambling.

Political career

Davey was not renowned as an MP.  However, when the National Liberal Club offered the seat of Christchurch he took the opportunity.  Elected in April 1880, he lost at the General Election of November 1885. On 16 February 1886, Gladstone appointed him the Solicitor-general in his government.  He was knighted during the short government on 8 March 1886.  Between 1886 and December 1888, he was seated at Stockport.  From 1888 he was MP for Stockton-on-Tees, but lost again in July 1892 at the General Election.

Judicial career
Having left parliament for the last time Davey was appointed as a bencher in Lincoln's Inn, on being promoted to the Court of Appeal on 23 September 1893.  By 23 November he was sworn to the Privy Council.  Monson v. Tussauds Ltd (1894) was a case that determined the future of a museum.  On 13 August, Davey was made a Lord of Appeal in Ordinary.

In 1877, Lord Russell of Killowen divorced his wife, in Russell v. Russell (1897).  She accused him of homosexuality, and unwisely used this as grounds for mental cruelty, as he had denied her a judicial separation.

In the famous Wee Frees Case, General Assembly of Free Church of Scotland (1906) the Great War intervened to withhold a judgement.  The occasion of a united church of Presbyterians caused the sale of property, the church lost £2 m of real property.  Haldane, acting for the church successfully argued the case in point, but lost the decision, although he won the deeds of property.  Nonetheless Parliament legislated at the transfer was ordered.

The case of Salomon v. Salomon (1896) was a precedent for many years on the nature of company law and incorporation.  The case of Allen v. Flood (1898) symbolized the number of political arguments between Liberals, like Davey and the Conservative Lord Halsbury, over the propriety of Trade Union rights.

Walter v. Lane (1900) was a case about the law of copyright for reporters.  Burland v. Earle (1901) was the fraud in the exception to the contract rules since 1843 in Foss v. Harbottle (1901).  Noakes Co v. Rice (1901) and Bradley v. Carritt (1903) were cases about the collateral benefits in mortgage laws.  In Ruben v. G. Fingall Cons (1906) it was established the effects of a forged certificate on a company.

In 1905, Davey approached the Liberal leader Sir Henry Campbell-Bannerman to become Lord Chancellor in the new government, but was turned down in favour of Lord Loreburn.  Davey and Lord Lindley were perhaps the greatest intellects of their generation.  Lord MacNaughten, himself a powerful thinker, called Davey "the most lawyer of his day."

Court appointments
Davey was counsel to Oxford University, 1877–93.  He was made an honorary fellow of University College, Oxford in 1884, and an honorary DCL by the University of Oxford in 1894.  On 24 Jan 1895, Davey was made a Fellow of the Royal Society (FRS).  As Treasurer of Lincoln's Inn he headed the Inn of Court, in 1897.  Partly due to the influence of his friend, Richard Haldane, Lord Davey was appointed Chairman of the Royal Commission to reconstitute the Statutes of the University of London (1897–98).  He was also a Fellow of the British Academy from 1905.

Family
Lord Davey married Louisa Donkin in 1862. He died in London in February 1907, aged 74. He was survived by his wife and two sons and four daughters.  Lord Davey died on Wednesday, 20 February 1907, at 86 Brook Street, London W1, of acute bronchitis.  He was buried at Forest Row, East Grinstead, three days later.

Arms

References

Bibliography
 R B Haldane, An Autobiography (London: Hodder & Stoughton, 1929)

External links 
 
 

1833 births
1907 deaths
People educated at Rugby School
Alumni of University College, Oxford
Fellows of University College, Oxford
Knights Bachelor
Law lords
Liberal Party (UK) MPs for English constituencies
People from Fernhurst
People from Christchurch, Dorset
UK MPs 1880–1885
UK MPs 1886–1892
UK MPs who were granted peerages
Solicitors General for England and Wales
Members of the Judicial Committee of the Privy Council
Fellows of the Royal Society
Fellows of the British Academy
English King's Counsel
Members of the Privy Council of the United Kingdom
People from Camberwell
Life peers created by Queen Victoria